Arnprior Airport  is a registered aerodrome located adjacent to and  south of the town of Arnprior, Ontario, Canada directly behind Arnprior Aerospace Inc. (formerly Boeing Canada Technology).

The aerodrome serves chiefly general aviation traffic, including private pilots, MEDEVAC, Ontario Hydro, and the Ontario Provincial Police. The Canadian Forces also use the aerodrome.

History
During World War II, the airport hosted No. 3 Flying Instructor School for the British Commonwealth Air Training Plan. Arnprior/South Renfrew Municipal Airport was the original location of the National Research Council of Canada Flight Research Laboratory until 1954 when it moved to its current location at the Ottawa International Airport in Ottawa.

Currently
The Arnprior Airport is currently home to Chapman Aviation which provides flight instruction, sightseeing and charter services. Chapman Aircraft Service also provides aircraft maintenance services.

See also
List of airports in the Ottawa area
List of British Commonwealth Air Training Plan facilities in Canada
Arnprior Water Aerodrome

References

External links

 Official website
 Page about this airport on COPA's Places to Fly airport directory
 Chapman Aviation Ltd. - Flight Instruction, Sightseeing, and Charters
 Chapman Aircraft Service Ltd. - Aircraft Maintenance

Registered aerodromes in Ontario
Airports of the British Commonwealth Air Training Plan
Transport in Renfrew County